Bernard Jarre (or Garves) (died 1328) was a French Cardinal in the period of the Avignon papacy.

Biography
He was born at Sainte-Livrade in the diocese of Agen and was a relative of Pope Clement V. From 1307 he is attested as archdeacon of Coutances. On 19 December 1310 Clement V appointed him cardinal-deacon of S. Agata; he was one of at least seven relatives of this pope promoted by him to the cardinalate. He participated in the papal conclave, 1314-1316. New Pope John XXII promoted him to the rank of cardinal-priest of S. Clemente on 18 December 1316. He died at Avignon.

See also

References

External links
 Bernard de Garves

14th-century French cardinals
Cardinal-nephews
1328 deaths
Year of birth unknown